Cymatodera balteata, the banded checkered beetle, is a species of checkered beetle in the family Cleridae. It is found in Central America and North America.

References

 Burke, Alan F., John M. Leavengood Jr., and Gregory Zolnerowich (2015). "A checklist of the New World species of Tillinae (Coleoptera: Cleridae), with an illustrated key to genera and new country records".
 Corporaal, J. B. / Hincks, W. D., ed. (1950). Coleopterorum Catalogus Supplementa, Pars 23: (Editio Secunda) Cleridae, 373.
 Wolcott, Albert B. (1947). "Catalogue of North American beetles of the family Cleridae". Fieldiana: Zoology, vol. 32, no. 2, 61–105.

Further reading

 Arnett, R. H. Jr., M. C. Thomas, P. E. Skelley and J. H. Frank. (eds.). (21 June 2002). American Beetles, Volume II: Polyphaga: Scarabaeoidea through Curculionoidea. CRC Press LLC, Boca Raton, Florida .
 Arnett, Ross H. (2000). American Insects: A Handbook of the Insects of America North of Mexico. CRC Press.
 Richard E. White. (1983). Peterson Field Guides: Beetles. Houghton Mifflin Company.

External links

 NCBI Taxonomy Browser, Cymatodera balteata

Tillinae
Beetles described in 1854